Abbotsford-Mount Lehman was a provincial electoral district for the Legislative Assembly of British Columbia, Canada from 2001 to 2009.

Demographics

Geography

1999 Redistribution
Changes from Matsqui to Abbotsford-Mount Lehman include:
Removal of the southeastern portion, in the Poplar and Mill Lake area

History

Member of the Legislative Assembly 
Its lone MLA was Hon. Mike de Jong, a former lawyer. He was first elected in 1994. He represents the British Columbia Liberal Party. Mr. de Jong was appointed Minister of Forests on June 5, 2001 and the Minister of Labour and Citizens' Services on June 16, 2005.  He was re-elected in the newly created riding of Abbotsford West during the 2009 general election.

Election results

External links 
BC Stats - 2001 (pdf)
Results of 2001 election (pdf)
2001 Expenditures (pdf)
Website of the Legislative Assembly of British Columbia

Former provincial electoral districts of British Columbia
Politics of Abbotsford, British Columbia